Licaria velutina is a species of plant in the family Lauraceae. It is endemic to Mexico.

References

Flora of Mexico
Lauraceae
Vulnerable plants
Taxonomy articles created by Polbot